Tan Jiajun (Chinese: 谭家军; Pinyin: Tán Jiājūn; born 17 December 1993 in Guangzhou) is a Chinese footballer who currently plays for Chinese club a Quanzhou Qinggong.

Club career
Tan Jiajun joined Guangzhou Evergrande's youth academy after he graduated from his high school. He played for the club's youth team Guangzhou Youth in the China League Two and scored five goals in 19 appearances in the 2011 season. He was promoted to Guangzhou's first team by then manager Lee Jang-Soo in 2012. On 11 May 2012, he made his debut for the club in a 3–1 loss against Dalian Shide, coming on as a substitute for Gao Zhilin in the 82nd minute. He suffered a cruciate ligament rupture in 2013 and was sent to the reserved team in 2015 and 2016.

In February 2017, Tan moved to China League One side Meizhou Kejia.

Career statistics

Honours

Club
Guangzhou Evergrande
Chinese Super League: 2012, 2013, 2014
Chinese FA Super Cup: 2012
Chinese FA Cup: 2012
AFC Champions League: 2013

References

Living people
1993 births
Footballers from Guangzhou
Association football midfielders
Chinese footballers
Guangzhou F.C. players
Meizhou Hakka F.C. players
Chinese Super League players
China League One players
21st-century Chinese people